Five provincial by-elections were held in the Canadian province of Newfoundland and Labrador in 2007, following vacancies in the Newfoundland and Labrador House of Assembly. Three took place on February 8, and two took place on February 13.

In addition, one special election took place on November 6, 2007, following the death of a candidate during the general election campaign in October.

Ferryland

Kilbride

Port au Port

Humber Valley
At first, it was announced that Darryl Kelly, the PC candidate, had won the election by a margin of twelve votes; however, it turned out that this was a mistake and that Dwight Ball, the Liberal candidate, had won by a margin of eighteen votes instead. Turnout was 62 per cent. Due to the close result of the by-election (which turned out to have been won by a margin of only nine votes in the official result), a judicial recount was ordered for March 1–2, 2007, which resulted in a reduction of Ball's lead to seven votes.

In the general election on October 9, however, Kelly defeated Ball by a 254-vote margin.

Labrador West

The NDP campaign suffered a number of mishaps, most notably the decision of their presumed candidate Karen Oldford to run for the Liberals instead, and the president of the United Steelworkers union local at Wabush Mines choosing to endorse the Labrador Party instead of the NDP.

Grand Falls-Windsor-Buchans
During the general election campaign, Liberal candidate Gerry Tobin died on October 1. As a result, the election was deferred in this district from October 9 to November 6. The new Liberal candidate, John Woodrow, withdrew from the race on November 3 after it was revealed that he had previously made false allegations of bribery against MHA Beaton Tulk in 1998, but then revived his campaign on November 5 after learning that it was too late to actually remove his name from the ballot.

References

2007 elections in Canada
Elections in Newfoundland and Labrador
Provincial by-elections in Newfoundland and Labrador